Manakamana  was a village development committee in Syangja District in the Gandaki Zone of central Nepal. At the time of the 2011 Nepal census it had a population of 4385 people living in 997 individual households. It is now merged to Biruwa Rural Municipality after the government of Nepal implemented a new local administrative structure in 12 March 2017.

References

External links
UN map of the municipalities of Syangja District

Populated places in Syangja District